No. 672 Squadron AAC is a squadron of the British Army's Army Air Corps (AAC).

See also

 List of Army Air Corps aircraft units

References

External links
 

Army Air Corps aircraft squadrons
Military units and formations established in 1990